Clairaut may refer to:

Alexis Claude Clairaut, French mathematician
Clairaut's equation
Clairaut's theorem
Clairaut (crater), a crater on the Moon